Pentaceras australe, commonly known as bastard crow's ash, penta ash or black teak, is the only species in the genus Pentaceras in the plant family Rutaceae. It is a small to medium-sized rainforest tree endemic to eastern Australia. It has pinnate leaves with up to fifteen leaflets, small white flowers arranged in panicles on the ends of branchlets, and winged seeds.

Description
The bark is smooth and grey fawn with small horizontal lines, flanged at the base of larger trees.

Taxonomy
The genus Pentaceras was first formally described in 1862 by George Bentham and Joseph Dalton Hooker in Genera Plantarum. In 1863, Ferdinand von Mueller described Cookia australis in Fragmenta phytographiae Australiae and in 1863, Bentham changed the name to Pentaceras australe in Flora Australiensis.

Distribution and habitat

Conservation status
Bastard crow's ash is classified as of "least concern" under the Queensland Government Nature Conservation Act 1992.

References

Zanthoxyloideae
Zanthoxyloideae genera
Trees of Australia
Flora of New South Wales
Flora of Queensland
Taxa named by Ferdinand von Mueller
Monotypic Rutaceae genera